Jack Mills (1 September 1905 – 28 February 1970) was a British railway worker who was the driver of the train that was robbed in the Great Train Robbery in 1963.

Great Train Robbery 

He boarded the train at the driver change-over at Crewe station, his home town, in Cheshire, on the train's journey to London Euston station, a journey that would take the train through Buckinghamshire, where the gang of robbers were waiting for it. There, Mills approached the set of two signals that were normally both green. The robbers had, however, changed the first set of signals to yellow, warning the driver to slow down, and the second set to red, telling the driver to stop the train. He stopped, and soon after the robbers launched their robbery. When they got into the cab of the locomotive, they attacked Mills with an iron bar, and he suffered a black eye and facial bruising. He was handcuffed to the train's secondman, David Whitby, in the locomotive's engine compartment. After the robbery, Mills was taken to the Royal Buckinghamshire Hospital in Aylesbury, where he and his second man had to wait for a free police officer to remove the handcuffs.

Aftermath 

Mills, who was 57 at the time of the robbery, never fully recovered from his injuries. He returned to work in May 1964, and worked for 18 months on light duties. He was then on sick leave from November 1965 until December 1966 with shingles. He returned for one last year in work for 1967, retiring for good at Christmas, with two and a half months off sick that year. Jack Mills sustained severe brain damage from blows to the head. He never recovered and suffered until his death.

Death 

When Ronnie Biggs' wife Charmian sold her story to the Sunday Mirror, it was revealed by rival papers that she had been paid £65,000, dwarfing the £250 compensation that Mills had received. The Daily Mail then launched an appeal on his behalf that raised £34,000, which enabled Mills to move into a more comfortable house in Crewe. Mills died in February 1970 shortly after moving. He died of chronic lymphocytic leukaemia, with a further complication of bronchial pneumonia.

The West Cheshire Coroner concluded that there was no reason to hold an inquest and that while he was aware that Mills had been injured in the incident, there was no connection as far as he was concerned.

Mills' assailant
The identity of the train robber who assaulted Mills has been the subject of some debate, but most sources agree that Mills' assailant was one of three members of the gang who were never identified. He was referred to as "Mr Three" by Ronnie Biggs, and "Alf Thomas" by Piers Paul Read and Bruce Reynolds. Where all accounts agree, is that Gordon Goody made Mills drive the train after the failure of the robbers' substitute driver, and that Charlie Wilson told Mills not to worry and that he would not be harmed and ensured he was left alone after that. Williams (at the time a retired Detective Chief Superintendent) claims in his 1973 book No Fixed Address:

"At least three men who were directly involved are still at liberty and enjoying to the full their share of the money stolen and the profits from the way they invested it. One of them is the man responsible for the attack on the train driver. The train driver's assailant is not some phantom figure lurking in the criminal underworld. I traced him, identified him and took him to Scotland Yard where, with Tommy Butler I questioned him. We were certain of our facts but he could not be charged because of lack of evidence suitable for presentation in a court; he had left no fingerprints or identifiable marks anywhere. None of those arrested informed on him although he had completely disobeyed instructions and used violence during the robbery. Otherwise, though, Williams gives no information on this person."

In a widely discredited version of the attack on Mills contained in The Train Robbers, by Piers Paul Read, the assailant is given as Buster Edwards. Edwards is listed as the assailant of both Whitby and Mills, although the description of the attack seems implausible given it does not match the description given at the trial and seems to have one train robber doing the entire assault by himself while the rest of the gang was idle. Reynolds dismisses the claim by Read, as the publishers at the time wanted the name of the perpetrator before they would do a deal, therefore Buster offered himself up as the villain (Edwards and Goody were the chief movers behind the Read book). Buster Edwards was the member of the gang who ambushed David Whitby, Mills' assistant (called the "fireman" or "second man" on diesel locomotives). At the same time the rest of the gang were moving into position with Roy James, "Bill "Flossy" Jennings", and Jimmy White uncoupling the carriages and the 'heavies' ambushing the cab of the locomotive itself.

Bruce Reynolds claims the person responsible was a friend of Jimmy White, who they had recruited for a previous job to be extra muscle. Reynolds himself was not at the train site as he was the spotter at the Ledburn road rail bridge and met the gang at the rendezvous point at Bridego Bridge after Mills was forced by Goody to drive the train. He describes "Alf Thomas" as "a big old boy, very reliable, and would have been useful for the money train" (their practice job) "because he had the muscle to disable the police cars by tipping them over before we sprayed them with fuller's earth and compressed air." (Crossing The Line, 1995, p. 178.)

On 12 November 2012, James 'Big Jim' Hussey admitted a few hours before his death to having carried out the attack on Mills. It has been conjectured that the confession was intended to divert suspicion from the surviving train robbers.

 References 

 Bibliography 
 The Robbers' Tale (1965) by Peta Fordham and first published by Hodder & Stoughton, London (ISBN ).
 No Fixed Address (1973) by Frank Williams, first published by W.H. Allen & Co Ltd.
 Slip Up (1975) by Anthony Delano and first published by Quadrangle / The New York Times Book Co..
 The Train Robbers (1978) by Piers Paul Read and first published by W.H. Allen and Company.
 Crossing The Line: Autobiography of a Thief (1995) by Bruce Reynolds, first published by Bantam Press.
 Odd Man Out'' (1994) by Ronald Biggs, first published by Bloomsbury Publishing Limited. 

1905 births
1970 deaths
Deaths from cancer in England
Deaths from leukemia
English victims of crime
Great Train Robbery (1963)
Place of birth missing
Deaths from pneumonia in England